The 2021–22 UNLV Lady Rebels basketball team represented the University of Nevada, Las Vegas during the 2021–22 NCAA Division I women's basketball season. The Lady Rebels were led by second-year head coach Lindy La Rocque. They played their home games at the Cox Pavilion, attached to the Thomas & Mack Center on UNLV's main campus in Paradise, Nevada. They were a member of the Mountain West Conference. They finished the season 23–6, 15–3 in Mountain West play to win the Mountain West Conference regular season title. They went on to win the Mountain West women's tournament over Colorado State. They lost to Arizona as a 13-seed in the Greensboro region of the first round of the NCAA tournament.

Roster

Schedule

|-
!colspan=9 style=|Exhibition

|-
!colspan=9 style=|Non-conference regular season

|-
!colspan=9 style=| Mountain West regular season

|-
!colspan=9 style=| Mountain West tournament

|-
!colspan=9 style=| NCAA Women's Tournament

See also
2021–22 UNLV Runnin' Rebels basketball team

References 

UNLV
UNLV Lady Rebels basketball seasons
Rebels
Rebels
UNLV